Rashidi may refer to:

 Rashidi dynasty, ruling family in Arabia

People 
 Ahmed Rashidi, Moroccan extrajudicial prisoner of the United States
 Ali Muhammad Rashidi (1905–1987), Pakistani politician
 Davoud Rashidi (1933–2016), Iranian actor
 Narges Rashidi (born 1980), American-German actress
 Rouzbeh Rashidi (born 1980), Iranian avant-garde filmmaker
 Runoko Rashidi (1954–2021), American historian
 Seif Rashidi (born 1957), Tanzanian politician

Places 
 Rashidi, Iran, a village in Lorestan Province

See also
 Al-Rashid (disambiguation)

Iranian-language surnames
Patronymic surnames
Surnames from given names